Hanif Kureishi  (born 5 December 1954) is a British playwright, screenwriter, filmmaker and novelist of South Asian and English descent. In 2008, The Times included Kureishi in its list of the 50 greatest British writers since 1945.

Early life
Kureishi was born in Bromley, South London to a Pakistani father, Rafiushan (Shanoo) Kureishi, and an English mother, Audrey Buss. His father was from a wealthy Madras family, whose members moved to Pakistan after the Partition of India in 1947. Rafiushan came to the UK in 1950 to study law but once he ran out of money it was necessary to take a desk job at the Pakistani embassy instead. Here he met his wife-to-be, Buss, "a young lower-middle-class suburban woman". He wanted to be a writer but his ambitions were frustrated, "eking out a life of permanent disappointment, writing novels on the kitchen table, but getting turned down." The couple were married, the family settled in Bromley where Kureishi was born. In an interview, Kureishi notes:My [paternal] grandfather, an army doctor, was a colonel in the Indian army. Big family. Servants. Tennis court. Cricket. Everything. My father went to the Cathedral School that Salman Rushdie went to. Later, in Pakistan, my family were close to the Bhuttos. My uncle Omar was a newspaper columnist and the manager of the Pakistan cricket team...My grandfather, the colonel, was terrifying. A hard-living, hard-drinking gambler. Womanising. Around him it was like The Godfather. They drank and they gossiped. The women would come and go.

Hanif Kureishi attended Bromley Technical High School and studied for A-levels at Bromley College of Technology. While at this college, he was elected as student union president (1972) and some of the characters from his semi-autobiographical work The Buddha of Suburbia are from this period. He went on to spend a year studying philosophy at Lancaster University, then withdrew. Later he attended King's College London and earned a degree in philosophy.

Career
Kureishi started his career in the 1970s as a pornography writer, under the pseudonyms Antonia French and Karim. He went on to write plays for the Hampstead Theatre, Soho Poly, and by the age of 18, was with the Royal Court. He wrote My Beautiful Laundrette in 1985, a screenplay about a gay Pakistani-British boy growing up in 1980s London for a film directed by Stephen Frears. The screenplay, especially the racial discrimination experienced, contained elements from Hanif's experiences as the only Pakistani student in his class at school. It won the New York City Film Critics Best Screenplay Award and an Academy Award nomination for Best Original Screenplay. He also wrote the screenplay for Sammy and Rosie Get Laid (1987). His book The Buddha of Suburbia (1990) won the Whitbread Award for the best first novel and was made into a BBC television series with a soundtrack by David Bowie. 1991 saw the release of the feature film titled London Kills Me, written and directed by Kureishi.

His novel Intimacy (1998) revolved around the story of a man leaving his wife and two young sons after feeling physically and emotionally rejected by his wife. This created some controversy as Kureishi recently had left his own partner (the editor and producer Tracey Scoffield) and two young sons; it was assumed to be at least semi-autobiographical. In 2000/2001, the novel was adapted into the film Intimacy by Patrice Chéreau, which won two Bears at the Berlin Film Festival: a Golden Bear for Best Film and a Silver Bear for Best Actress (Kerry Fox). It was controversial for its explicit sex scenes. The book was translated into Persian by Niki Karimi in 2005.

Kureishi's drama The Mother was adapted as a film by Roger Michell, which won a joint First Prize in the Director’s Fortnight section at Cannes Film Festival. It showed a cross-generational relationship with a reversal of expected roles: a 70-year-old English grandmother (played by Anne Reid) seduces her daughter's boyfriend (played by Daniel Craig), a 30-year-old craftsman. Explicit sex scenes were shown in realistic drawings only, thus avoiding censorship. He wrote the 2006 screenplay Venus, and for his performance in this movie, Peter O'Toole received Oscar, BAFTA, Screen Actors Guild, Broadcast Film Critics Association and Golden Globe nominations in the best actor category.

A novel titled Something to Tell You was published in 2008. His 1995 novel The Black Album, adapted for the theatre, was performed at the National Theatre in July and August 2009. In May 2011, he was awarded the second Asia House Literature Award on the closing night of the Asia House Literary Festival where he discussed his Collected Essays (Faber).

Kureishi has written non-fiction, including autobiography. As noted by Cathy Galvin in The Telegraph: "But at the core of his life, as described in his memoir My Ear at His Heart is Kureishi’s relationship with his father, Rafiushan, who died in 1991."

Personal life
Kureishi, who is bisexual, lives in West London. 

He has twin boys (from his relationship with film producer Tracey Scoffield) and a younger son. Although he acknowledges his father's Pakistani roots (originating in Madras, in British India, present-day Chennai, India), he rarely visits Pakistan. Upon a 2012 visit sponsored by the British Council, he acknowledged that it was his first trip to Pakistan in 20 years. Kureishi's uncle was the writer, columnist and Pakistani cricket commentator and team manager Omar Kureishi. The poet Maki Kureishi was his aunt.

Kureishi's family have accused him of exploiting them with thinly disguised references in his work; Kureishi has denied the claims. His sister Yasmin has accused him of selling her family "down the line". She wrote, in a letter to The Guardian, that if her family's history had to become public, she would not stand by and let it be "fabricated for the entertainment of the public or for Hanif's profit". She says that his description of her family's working-class roots are fictitious. Their grandfather was not "cloth cap working class", their mother never worked in a shoe factory, and their father, she says, was not a bitter old man. Yasmin takes issues with her brother for his thinly disguised autobiographical references in his first novel The Buddha of Suburbia as well as for the image of his own past that he portrays in newspaper interviews. She wrote: "My father was angry when The Buddha of Suburbia came out as he felt that Hanif had robbed him of his dignity, and he didn't speak to Hanif for about a year." Kureishi and his father did not speak for many months during the controversy. There was further furore with the publication of Intimacy as the story was assumed to be autobiographical.

He was appointed Commander of the Order of the British Empire (CBE) in the 2008 New Year Honours for services to Literature and Drama. 

In early 2013, Kureishi lost his life savings, intended to cover "the ups and downs of being a writer", in a suspected fraud. In October of that year, Kureishi was appointed as a professor in the creative writing department at Kingston University in London, where he was a writer in residence. However, at The Independent Bath Literature Festival, 2 March 2014, he stated that creative writing courses were a "waste of time" and commented that 99.9% of his students were talentless. 

In 2014, the British Library announced that it would be acquiring the archive of Kureishi's documents spanning 40 years of his writing life. The body of work was to include diaries, notebooks and drafts.

On 26 December 2022, Kureishi was hospitalised following a fall in Rome, which left him with spinal injuries and unable to move his limbs. According to Kureishi, the fall triggered a near-death experience. The author stated in an interview that he was convinced he was going to die while in hospital. Kureishi stated that his partner, Isabella d'Amico, helped keep him calm and saved his life.

Major influences on Kureishi's writing include P.G. Wodehouse and Philip Roth. His entry in Who's Who lists his recreations as "music, cricket, sitting in pubs".

Awards and honours
 1980 Thames Television Playwright Award, The Mother Country
 1981 George Devine Award, Outskirts
 1986 New York Film Critics Circle Award for Best Screenplay for My Beautiful Laundrette 
 1986 Academy Award nomination for Best Screenplay for My Beautiful Laundrette 
 1990 Whitbread First Novel Award, The Buddha of Suburbia
 2007 National Short Story Competition, shortlist for "Weddings and Beheadings"
 2008 Commander of the Order of the British Empire (CBE)
 2010 PEN/Pinter Prize
 2013 Outstanding Achievement in the Arts at The Asian Awards.

Written works

Novels
 1990 The Buddha of Suburbia, London: Faber and Faber
 1995 The Black Album, London: Faber and Faber
 1998 Intimacy, London: Faber and Faber
 2001 Gabriel's Gift, London: Faber and Faber
 2003 The Body, London: Faber and Faber
 2008 Something to Tell You, London: Faber and Faber
 2014 The Last Word, London: Faber and Faber
 2017 The Nothing, London: Faber and Faber
 2019 What Happened?, London: Faber and Faber

Story collections
 1997 Love in a Blue Time, London: Faber and Faber
 1999 Midnight All Day, London: Faber and Faber
 2019 "She Said, He Said", The New Yorker

Collection of stories and essays
 2011 Collected Essays, Faber and Faber
 2015 Love + Hate: Stories and Essays, Faber & Faber

Plays and screenplays
 1980 The King and Me, London: Faber and Faber
 1981 Outskirts, London: Faber and Faber
 1981 Borderline, London: Faber and Faber
 1983 Birds of Passage, London: Faber and Faber
 1988 Sammy and Rosie Get Laid, London: Faber and Faber
 1991 London Kills Me, London: Faber and Faber
 1996 My Beautiful Laundrette and other writings, London: Faber and Faber
 1997 My Son the Fanatic, London: Faber and Faber
 1999 Hanif Kureishi Plays One, London: Faber and Faber
 1999 Sleep with Me, London: Faber and Faber
 2002 Collected Screenplays Volume I, London: Faber and Faber
 2003 The Mother, London: Faber and Faber
 2004 When The Night Begins, London: Faber and Faber
 2007 Venus, London: Faber and Faber
 2009 The Black Album (adapted from the novel), London: Faber and Faber

Nonfiction
 2002 Dreaming an Scheming: Reflections on Writing and Politics
 2004 My Ear at His Heart, London: Faber and Faber
 2005 The Word and the Bomb , London: Faber and Faber
 2014 A Theft: My Con Man , London: Faber and Faber

As editor
 1995 The Faber Book of Pop. London: Faber and Faber

Filmography
Kureishi's films include:

Screenplays
 1985 My Beautiful Laundrette
 1987 Sammy and Rosie Get Laid
 1991 London Kills Me (and director)
 1993 The Buddha of Suburbia (television miniseries, based on the novel)
 1997 My Son the Fanatic (based on his own short story of the same title)
 1999 Mauvaise passe (aka The Escort, aka The Wrong Blonde) (with Michel Blanc)
 2003 The God of Small Tales (short) (with Akram Khan)
 2003 The Mother (adapted from the play)
 2006 Venus
 2007 Weddings and Beheadings (2007)
 2013 Le Week-End

Story basis only
 2001 Intimacy

Producer
 2006 Souvenir

References

Further reading
 Moore-Gilbert, Bart, Hanif Kureishi (Contemporary World Writers), Manchester: Manchester University Press, 2001
 Ranasinha, Ruvani, Hanif Kureishi (Writers and Their Work), Devon: Northcote House Publishers Ltd, 2002
 Thomas, Susie (ed), Hanif Kureishi (Readers' Guides to Essential Criticism), Palgrave Macmillan, 2005
 Buchanan, Bradley, Hanif Kureishi (New British Fiction), Palgrave Macmillan, 2007
Colin MacCabe and Hanif Kureishi, "Hanif Kureishi and London", AA Files, No. 49 (Spring 2003), pp. 40–49, published by: Architectural Association School of Architecture
 Kaleta, Kenneth C, Hanif Kureishi: Postcolonial Storyteller, University of Texas Press, 1998

External links

 
 Faber and Faber – UK publisher of Hanif Kureishi
 Waraich, Omar. When Bombs Speak Louder Than Words, Interview with Hanif Kureishi. The Daily Star, Beirut -International Herald Tribune  28 January 2006
 "In Conversation: Hanif Kureishi with Hirsh Sawhney". The Brooklyn Rail, July/Aug 2006
 Audio interview with Hanif Kureishi from OpenLearn, 12 January 2007
 Audio: Hanif Kureishi in conversation on the BBC World Service discussion show The Forum
Hanif Kureishi at the British Library

1954 births
Living people
People from Bromley
English male dramatists and playwrights
English male short story writers
English male novelists
English dramatists and playwrights
English screenwriters
English male screenwriters
English short story writers
British writers of Pakistani descent
English people of Pakistani descent
Muhajir people
English LGBT dramatists and playwrights
English LGBT screenwriters
Bisexual screenwriters
Bisexual novelists
Bisexual dramatists and playwrights
Postcolonial literature
Commanders of the Order of the British Empire
Fellows of the Royal Society of Literature
Fellows of King's College London
Alumni of King's College London
Alumni of Lancaster University
Academics of Kingston University
20th-century English novelists
20th-century British dramatists and playwrights
20th-century British short story writers
21st-century British novelists
21st-century British dramatists and playwrights
21st-century British short story writers